The Empire Strikes Back is the fifth studio album by Country Teasers.

Reception
Frieze magazine described the album as "Full of moral outrage, scything black humour and joyful Garage-Punk invention, it is also a provocative assault on the hypocritical uses and abuses of language."

Track listing
All tracks written by Ben Wallers except where noted.

Side one
"Spiderman in the Flesh" (Wallers/Roger Waters) – 4:09
"Points of View" – 5:06
"Hitlers & Churchills" – 3:09
"Mos E17ley" – 4:43
"The Ship" – 4:15
"Raglan Top of Lonsdale Grey" – 5:26

Side two
"Good Looking Boys or Women" – 3:23
"Your English" – 3:56
"Panic Holiday" – 3:42
"White Patches" – 7:16
"Please Ban Music / Gegen Alles" – 5:02

Personnel
Leighton Crook – drums, bass (11)
Alastair Mackinven – guitar, percussion (9)
Robert McNeill – keyboard, guitar "Oscillations" (4)
Sophie Politowicz – bass guitar, drums (11)
Ben Wallers – vocals, guitar; creaking on the "Ship, Oscillations" (9)

References

2006 albums
Country Teasers albums
In the Red Records albums